Fabryczna   is one of the five administrative boroughs (dzielnicas) of Wrocław, Poland. Its functions were largely taken over on 8 March 1990 by the Municipal Office of the newly established Wrocław Municipality. The name Fabryczna remained in use, mainly for statistical and administrative purposes. The other dzielnicas are Stare Miasto, Krzyki, Psie Pole and Śródmieście. 

Fabryczna is a Polish adjective derived from the noun fabryka ("factory"), and therefore the name roughly translates as "industrial". It is located in the western part of the city, on the left (south) side of the Oder river. It is Wrocław's largest borough, and some of the crucial industrial facilities are located there.

Fabryczna encompasses the Popowice, Kozanów, Maślice, Stabłowice, Strachowice, Grabiszyn, Leśnica, Gądów Mały, Złotniki, Mokra, Marszowice, Pracze Odrzańskie, Nowy Dwór, Muchobór Mały, Muchobór Wielki, Żerniki and Oporów osiedles.

Flood of 1997 
The northern part of Fabryczna district was severely damaged in the flood of 1997, especially in the Kozanów neighbourhood, which remained flooded for two weeks. Food and medicines were supplied to its inhabitants with the help of the military. The source of the flooding of this neighbourhood was not the Oder itself but the Bystrzyca, a small river which flows into the Oder in the proximity of Kozanów.

Landmarks
Fabryczna is home to the Wroclaw Municipal Stadium as well as several parks including Park Zachodni, and Park Tysiąclecia. The A8 highway runs through he district. The Milenijny and Rędziński bridges connect it to the other side of the Oder. The dzielnica is the location of the Magnolia Park shopping mall. It is also the home of the Wrocław Airport.

Geography

Climate
This area has few extremes of temperature and ample precipitation in all months.  The Köppen Climate Classification subtype for this climate is "Cfb". (Marine West Coast Climate).

External links 
 The history of the flood in Wrocław in 1997
 Pictures of the flood

References

Districts of Wrocław